Kalastavadi Puttaswamy (1917 - 1978) was an Indian lawyer, and a senior Indian National Congress politician, who remained a member of Karnataka Legislative Assembly (1952–1977), three times from Mysore and subsequently twice from Chamundeshwari constituency, who also served as Minister of various ministries of Government of Karnataka, including Labour, Public Administration and  Health & Housing. He has also remained member of the Constituent Assembly in 1948.

Biography
He was born in 1917 to an agriculturist family as the first son of Late Sri. Kalastavadi Srilingegowda and Late Smt. Lingamma.

From his childhood he was very studious, always ahead in his studies, quiet and more thoughtful. He secured Hons. Degree in Psychology from the University of Mysore. Later he did his Law Degree in Belgaum Law College. Besides, being a good student, he involved himself in curricular activities. He was a freedom fighter. Later he became the President of Mysore City Corporation, President of District Cooperative Society and he was elected as a Member of Karnataka Legislative Assembly, from Mysore city. He was also a member of Mysore University Senate and Syndicate.

His exemplary behaviour, promptness, his love of serving the people made him rise to the level of a Minister under the guidance of the then Chief Minister S. Nijalingappa. He served as a Cabinet Minister of Health, Co-operation, Law and Labour very efficiently.

His son P. Vishwanath was the first Mayor of Mysore.

Vidyavardhaka Sangha
Vidyavardhaka Sangha in Mysore, a dream of Late K. Puttaswamy made its humble beginning in the year 1948-49 with an intention of propagating education to the poorer sections of the society, at a small choultry in Mysore. He was a true Gandhian, social worker, political leader and a disciplined person who dedicated his whole life to the betterment of the downtrodden people.

Vidyavardhaka Educational Institution has since grown by leaps and bounds. It imparts education not only at high school level, but also Nursery, Primary, Junior, Degree, Law, Engineering, JOC, ITI, Diploma and Management courses, including Vidya Vardhaka College of Engineering.

Now Vidyavardhaka Sangha stands as one of the prestigious educational institutions in the Heritage City of Mysore. This has been possible because of the dedication and pragmatic approach towards education by Late K. Puttaswamy. All these have materialized because of the services and contributions by great philanthropist whose main motto was "Service before Self" and "Education for all".

References

External links
                 Vidyavardhaka College Of Engineering
VVCE

Politicians from Mysore
1917 births
1978 deaths
20th-century Indian lawyers
University of Mysore alumni
State cabinet ministers of Karnataka
Indian National Congress politicians from Karnataka
Members of the Constituent Assembly of India
20th-century Indian educational theorists
Mysore MLAs 1952–1957
Mysore MLAs 1957–1962
Mysore MLAs 1962–1967
Mysore MLAs 1967–1972
Mysore MLAs 1972–1977
Karnataka MLAs 1978–1983
People from Mysore district
Kannada people
Members of the Mysore Legislature